After World War I, the effort to prosecute Ottoman war criminals was taken up by the Paris Peace Conference (1919) and ultimately included in the Treaty of Sèvres (1920) with the Ottoman Empire. The Ottoman government organized a series of courts martial in 1919–1920 to prosecute war criminals, but these failed on account of political pressure. The main effort by the Allied administration that occupied Constantinople fell short of establishing an international tribunal in Malta to try the so-called Malta exiles, Ottoman war criminals held as POWs by the British forces in Malta. In the end, no tribunals were held in Malta.

Taner Akçam states that protecting war criminals from prosecution became a key priority of the Turkish nationalist movement. According to European Court of Human Rights judge Giovanni Bonello the suspension of prosecutions, the repatriation and release of Turkish detainees was amongst others a result of the lack of an appropriate legal framework with supranational jurisdiction, because following World War I no international norms for regulating war crimes existed.  The release of the Turkish detainees was accomplished in exchange for 22 British prisoners held by Mustafa Kemal Atatürk.

Since there were no international laws in place under which they could be tried, the men who orchestrated the Armenian genocide escaped prosecution and traveled relatively freely throughout Germany, Italy, and Central Asia. This led to the formation of Operation Nemesis, a covert operation conducted by Armenians during which Ottoman political and military figures who fled prosecution were assassinated for their role in the Armenian genocide.

Background

Allied reactions to the massacres, 1915–1917
Following the reportage by Henry Morgenthau, Sr., US Ambassador to the Ottoman Empire, of the Armenian resistance during the Armenian genocide at the city of Van, the Triple Entente formally warned the Ottoman Empire on 24 May 1915 that: 
In the view of these ... crimes of Turkey against humanity and civilization ... the Allied governments announce publicly ... that they will hold personally responsible ... all members of the Ottoman Government and those of their agents who are implicated in such massacres.

Turkish courts martial, 1919–1920

The initial prosecution of war criminals was established between 1919 and 1920 by the Turkish Committee of Union and Progress which charged and tried several former leaders and officials for subversion of the Constitution, War profiteering, and with what is now called genocide against both Greeks and Armenians.  At the same time the British Foreign Office conducted its own investigation into alleged war crimes, debating whether the process was adequately dealt with by Turkish courts martial.

The court sat for nearly a year, from April 1919 through March 1920, although it became clear after just a few months that the tribunal was simply going through the motions. The judges had conveniently condemned the first set of defendants (Enver, et al.) when they were safely out of the country, but now, with Turkish lives genuinely on the line, the Tribunal, despite making a great show of its efforts, had no intention of returning convictions. Admiral Sir Somerset Gough-Calthorpe protested to the Sublime Porte, took the trials out of Turkish hands, and removed the proceedings to Malta. There an attempt was made to seat an international tribunal, but the Turks bungled the investigations and mishandled the documentary evidence so that nothing of their work could be used by the international court.

Admiral John de Robeck replaced Admiral Gough-Calthorpe on August 5, 1919 as "Commander in Chief, Mediterranean, and High Commissioner, at Constantinople". In August 1920, the proceedings were halted, and Admiral John de Robeck informed London of the futility of continuing the tribunal with the remark: "Its findings cannot be held of any account at all." According to European Court of Human Rights judge Giovanni Bonello, "quite likely the British found the continental inquisitorial system of penal procedure used in Turkey repugnant to its own paths to criminal justice and doubted the propriety of relying on it". Or, possibly, the Turkish government never came round to hand over the incriminating documents used by the military courts. Whatever the reason, with the advent of power of Atatürk, all the documents on which the Turkish military courts had based their trials and convictions were "lost".

Prosecution in Malta

Malta exiles

Malta exiles (between March 1919October 1920) is the term used by Turkey for war criminals (including high-ranking soldiers, political figures and administrators) of the Ottoman Empire who were selected from Constantinople prisons and sent into exile to the Crown Colony of Malta after the armistice of Mudros, in a failed attempt of prosecution that occurred during the Occupation of Constantinople by the Allied forces. Following the occupation of Smyrna by the Greek forces in May 1919, large manifestations in protest occurred on the Anatolian mainland raising pressure upon the courts martial. The judges then ordered the release of 41 suspects in order to calm down the situation. The release was not what the allied forces had in mind, and caused them to consider a better detention facility than the Bekirağa military prison, well aware that the prison might be captured by the protestors and its prisoners released. 

The Allied Government sent sixty seven war criminals to Malta in a prosecution attempt coordinated by the British forces. Ottoman war criminals were named and relocated from Constantinople's jails to the British colony of Malta on board of SS Princess Ena Malta and  starting in 1919, where they were believed to be held for some three years while searches were made in the archives of Constantinople, London, Paris and Washington to find a way to prosecute them. The prisoners were secluded in three different groups.

 A: for people suspected of having taken part in massacres
 B: for people suspected of having tolerated massacres
 C: for people who were not suspected of having taken direct action in massacres

The competing Ankara government was strictly opposed to trials against war criminals. Mustafa Kemal Atatürk reasoned about the detainees in Malta on the occasion of the congress in Sivas 4 September 1919: "...should any of the detainees either already brought or yet to be brought to Constantinople be executed, even at the order of the vile Constantinople government, we would seriously consider executing all British prisoners in our custody." From February 1921 the military court in Constantinople begun releasing prisoners without trials.

The release of the Turkish detainees in Malta was accomplished in exchange for 22 British prisoners held by Mustafa Kemal Atatürk. As a result of this, the British authorities did not use any of the – mostly documentary – evidence on Armenian atrocities of which Turkish prisoners had been accused and convicted by Turkish military courts shortly after the armistice. Ottoman military members and high-ranking politicians convicted by the Turkish courts-martial were transferred from Constantinople prisons to the Crown Colony of Malta on board Princess Ena and HMS Benbow by the British forces, starting in 1919. Admiral Sir Somerset Gough-Calthorpe was in charge of the operation, together with Lord Curzon; they did so owing to the lack of transparency of the Turkish courts-martial. They were held there for three years, while searches were made of archives in Constantinople, London, Paris and Washington to find a way to put them on trial. However, the war criminals were eventually released without trial and returned to Constantinople in 1921, in exchange for 22 British prisoners of war held by the government in Ankara, including a relative of Lord Curzon. The government in Ankara was opposed to political power of the government in Constantinople. They are often mentioned as the Malta exiles in some sources.

Legal foundation
In 1918 an American list of 11 "outlaws of civilization" was drawn up to be targeted for "condign punishment":

The British Foreign Office demanded 141 Turks be tried for crimes against British soldiers, and 17 for the crimes against Armenians during World War I.

The Allied authority to proceed with any prosecutions was created as part of the Paris Peace Conference, 1919, with the establishment of "The Commission on Responsibilities and Sanctions", which was chaired by U.S Secretary of State Robert Lansing. The Commission's work saw several articles added to the Treaty of Sèvres to effect indictments against the acting heads of government of the Ottoman Empire, Sultan Mehmed VI and Damat Adil Ferit Pasha. The Treaty of Sèvres gave recognition of the Democratic Republic of Armenia and developed a mechanism to bring to trial those accused of "barbarous and illegitimate methods of warfare... [including] offenses against the laws and customs of war and the principles of humanity".

Article 230 of the Treaty of Sèvres required the Ottoman Empire:

As a signatory to the treaty, the Ottoman Empire specifically recognized the right of the Allies to convene international tribunals to conduct war crimes trials.

By 1921 the British High Commission had gathered a body of information from its Greek and Armenian sources about the Turkish prisoners held at Malta, and about 1000 others, all alleged to have been directly or indirectly guilty of participation in massacres. The Allies had "a mountain of documents" related to the Armenian genocide, but these were mostly general and did not clearly implicate specific individuals.

Suspension of prosecution
According to the former judge at the European Court of Human Rights Giovanni Bonello the suspension of prosecutions, the repatriation and release of Turkish detainees was amongst others a result of the lack of an appropriate legal framework with supranational jurisdiction, because following World War I no international norms for regulating war crimes existed, due to a legal vacuum in international law; therefore contrary to Turkish sources, no trials were ever held in Malta.

On March 16, 1921, the Turkish Foreign Minister and the British Foreign Office signed an agreement in London. In exchange for the 22 British prisoners in Turkey, among them a relative of Lord Curzon and brother of Lord Rawlinson, Britain would set free 64 Turkish prisoners from Malta. These excluded those it was intended to prosecute for alleged offences in violation of the laws and customs of war or for massacres committed in any part of the Turkish Empire after war had broken out. British Admiral Sir John Michael de Robeck, who had been second-in-command of Allied naval forces at the Dardanelles, commented: "It would be hard under these conditions to convict most of the exiles before an Allied court."

In relation to prisoner exchange Article 2 under the Agreement For the Immediate Release of Prisoners reads:

British Foreign Secretary Lord Curzon said the subsequent release of many of the Turkish prisoners was "a great mistake", and wrote:

Aftermath

Separate Turkish domestic prosecutions resulted in the convictions and sentencing to death of many of the masterminds of the Armenian genocide. As many of the principal architects of the genocide had managed to escape prior to sentencing, the Armenian Revolutionary Federation decided at its 9th General Congress, which convened in Yerevan from September 27 to the end of October 1919, to pursue an assassination campaign against those it perceived to be responsible. A task force, led by Shahan Natalie, working with Grigor Merjanov, was established to assassinate Talaat Pasha, Javanshir Khan, Said Halim Pasha, Behaeddin Shakir Bey, Jemal Azmi, Jemal Pasha, Enver Pasha, and others, including several Armenians.

Some of those accused as war criminals led politically influential lives in the nascent Turkish state. Mustafa Abdülhalik Renda, for instance, who had "work[ed] with great energy for the destruction of the Armenians", later became the Turkish Minister of Finance and Speaker of the Assembly and, for one day, following the death of Kemal Atatürk, President.  General Vehip Pasa, and various German sources, also implicated Abdülhalik in the burning to death of thousands of people in Mus Province.

Armenian historian Vahakn N. Dadrian commented that the Allied efforts at prosecution were an example of "a retributive justice [that] gave way to expedience of political accommodation".

Peter Balakian — referring to the post-war Ottoman military tribunals, none of which was held in Malta — commented that "The trials represent a milestone in the history of war-crimes tribunals." Although they were truncated in the end by political pressures, and directed by Turkey's domestic laws rather than an international tribunal, the Constantinople trials (Turkish Courts-Martial of 1919-20) were an antecedent to the Nuremberg Trials following World War II.

In 1926, Kemal had Mehmet Cavit Bey, Nazım Bey, and Hilmi hanged for allegedly plotting to assassinate him. They were the highest-level Armenian genocide perpetrators left alive although the trial made no reference to their role in the genocide.

Purging of evidence
A WikiLeaks cable classified and signed by David Arnett on July 4, 2004 at the Consulate General of the US in Istanbul states the following:

 

According to the cable, ambassador Birgi was effectively in charge of destroying evidence during the 1980s. During the process of eliminating the evidence, ambassador Birgi stated in reference to the Armenians: "We really slaughtered them." Others, such as Tony Greenwood, the Director of the American Research Institute in Turkey, confirmed that a select group of retired military personnel were "going through" the archives. However, it was noted by a certain Turkish scholar that the examination was merely an effort to purge documents found in the archives.

See also 
 Turkish Courts-Martial of 1919–20
 Young Turks
 Committee of Union and Progress
 Outline and timeline of the Greek genocide

References

Books

Foreign relations of the Ottoman Empire
Aftermath of the Armenian genocide
Greek genocide
History of Malta
World War I war crimes trials